The  National Gridiron League (NGL) was a proposed gridiron football league. In 2021, after three years of postponed seasons, the organization has rebranded as the United Football League.

Prior to the postponed 2019 season, the league logo used was a near copy of the former United Football League, while many of the team names and logos are also copies of former football teams. League chairman Joe E. McClendon III said that those trademarks had expired and it makes good business sense to recycle them in an attempt to capture the already existing fan-bases.

A number of cases in the past have raised questions about whether this is a legitimate league or a scam and the United Football Players Association had warned prospective players from signing with the league. In 2021, players were told that their accommodations would be covered, only to find that they were responsible for the bills after staying several nights at a hotel in Fort Wayne, leading to a physical altercation with a player and Joe McClendon over the issue.

History

National Gridiron League (2018–2021)
Initially the league announced that it had planned to start play as an indoor football league in spring 2019, with 12 teams aligned in two divisions starting on March 30, 2019, and conclude with the inaugural Gridiron Bowl game on August 10, 2019, in Biloxi, Mississippi. However, the league pushed back the announced start of the inaugural season to May 2019 amid reports the league had not had finalized leases for many of its teams.

By April 2, team coaches informed the players the season was canceled as the league was not going to be able to honor their original contracts and that none of the team staff or coaches had ever been paid. League chairman Joe McClendon announced the following day that league had postponed its inaugural season to 2020 citing organizational changes in personnel and the suspension of operations of the Alliance of American Football. Its personnel later sued the league over their claims of non-payment for their work.

The league continued pursuits of a 2020 season including announcing player signings and scheduled Organized Team Activities (OTAs) for January 24–26, 2020. However, all OTAs were canceled the evening of January 24 after players had started arriving. The league then announced that teams would be allowed to play outdoors. The 2020 season was postponed amidst the COVID-19 pandemic.

The league originally announced a 2021 schedule with all games to be held outdoors as a traditional spring league. On January 31, 2021, the league announced it would play all games at single location, without confirming the site, with a planned start date of April 10. It was pushed back again to May 1 with the season to take place in Fort Wayne, Indiana, at an unannounced venue. As of April 2021, no venue in Fort Wayne was ever secured.

On April 10, 2021, Joe McClendon and several others showed up to protest at the Glenbrook Square mall in Fort Wayne claiming the city is not holding up to the agreed deal to aid the players in providing hotel accommodations. The players had been told the city would cover the costs of their hotel bills, but had been given notice to evacuate their rooms the morning of April 10 when the rates had not been paid. The city of Fort Wayne responded that they had never made any commitments or arrangements with the league at all, they had only had a few meetings with McClendon to point him where to look for community engagement, venues, and lodging. On April 12, the city then stated they would have no further discussion for a partnership with the league.

On the evening of April 12, McClendon met with the players in the hotel conference room where they were staying and told them the Fort Wayne event was cancelled and they would not be getting any aid in paying for the rooms from the city or the league. A player then physically attacked McClendon over being stranded in the city and frauded out of the tryout fees, travel, and accommodation rates. McClendon insisted there would still be a 2021 season, but in a different city and claims the league must play this year due to taking out a PPP loan that must be used. He also stated that when Visit Fort Wayne, the city's visitor bureau, had contacted him about having the season in the city, that they would provide lodging in the city. Visit Fort Wayne countered with saying they had only agreed to find rooms for the players, not pay for them, but that they would advocate with the local hotels for lower rates.

Rebrand
In August 2021, a new website was created under the name United Football League (UFL), stating it is a continuation of two former leagues of the same name (the UFL from the 1960s and the unrelated UFL that operated from 2009 to 2012) and that it had purchased the teams from the now-defunct NGL. However, the new league is a rebrand of the same organization behind the NGL, including still having occasional references to itself as the National Gridiron League within the new website left over the web address move. It originally proposed a 2022 season with many of the 11 of the 12 teams from the NGL, but the season was postponed to April 2023 with 14 proposed teams. On February 2023 the league announced that training camp will start on March 31, 2023 with the season starting on April 22. The UFL plans to play a 8-on-8 football in a modular-built stadiums.

Teams

Announced 2019 teams
As of February 21, 2019. Cities in italics were locations identified by the league website, but no leases for an arena were confirmed to have been signed in the listed location. Since the postponement, all arena references on the league website have been removed and most coaches have either been changed or moved on to other leagues.

2020 teams
As of March 26, 2020. No home venues were confirmed to have been signed in any listed locations although they were listed on the posted schedule.

2021
Original outdoor venues were listed on the league ticket purchasing website, but were not been confirmed by any of the venues themselves. Later plans were for a single-site season in Fort Wayne, Indiana.

2022
Listed members of the United Football League as of September 18, 2021. There were no listed venues for any of the teams.

2023
Listed members of the United Football League of February 28, 2022. There are no listed venues for any of the teams.

Personnel
Chairman and president: Joe E. McClendon, III
Chief operating officer: Larry Barlow
Director of football development: Eddie Brown (in 2019)

References

External links
NGL website
UFL Football Rebranded name

Indoor American football leagues in the United States
Sports leagues established in 2017